In cricket, a five-wicket haul (also known as a "five-for" or "fifer") refers to a bowler taking five or more wickets in a single innings. This is regarded as a significant achievement. , 159 cricketers have taken a five-wicket haul on their debut in a Test match, with nine of them being taken by West Indian players. They have taken a five-wicket haul on debut against five different opponents: four times against England, twice against India, and once against Australia, Pakistan and Sri Lanka each. Of the nine occasions, the West Indies won the match four times, and drew once. The players have taken five-wicket hauls at three different venues, two in the West Indies and one overseas. The most common venue for a West Indies player to achieve the feat is Sabina Park in Kingston, Jamaica, where it has occurred five times. All three hauls which occurred overseas took place at Old Trafford in Manchester, England.

Hines Johnson was the first West Indian player to take a five-wicket haul on his Test debut, taking five wickets for 41 runs against England in 1948. Alf Valentine, Darren Sammy and Franklyn Rose took eight, seven and six wickets respectively, while six others have taken five wickets on their debut. Valentine took eight wickets for 104 runs, the best bowling figures by a West Indian bowler on debut, against England in 1950, at Old Trafford, Manchester. He accumulated 11 wickets for 204 runs in the match. Johnson and Valentine are the only West Indians to have taken ten wickets in a match on debut; Johnson is one of only nine bowlers to take two five-wicket hauls on debut. Amongst the bowlers, Johnson is the most economical, with 1.17 runs per over, and Sammy has the best strike rate. , the most recent bowler to achieve the feat was Sammy, taking seven wickets for 66 runs in his debut Test, against England in 2007.

Key

Five-wicket hauls

See also
 List of Test cricketers who have taken five wickets on debut

References

Notes

Specific

West Indies

Five wickets